Doctor Who at the BBC Radiophonic Workshop Volume 1: The Early Years 1963–1969 is the first in a series of compilations of Doctor Who material recorded by the BBC Radiophonic Workshop. Compiled and remastered by Mark Ayres, the album features mostly sound effects and atmospheres from the first six years of the programme. Although some incidental music tracks do appear, most of the album's content is by original Doctor Who sound effects creator Brian Hodgson. The compilation also features three Radiophonic Workshop realisations of early Doctor Who composer Dudley Simpson's work.

The compilation was the first release of Radiophonic Workshop material following the department's closure and was intended by archiver Ayres to be the beginning of a series covering the varied output of the department. The series was to have included material from other children's programmes such as Roger Limb's score from The Box of Delights as well as music from documentaries and radio, although only material related to Doctor Who has so far been released.

Track listing

External links
Producer's notes
Album information

BBC Radiophonic Workshop albums
Doctor Who soundtracks
2000 compilation albums
Sound effects albums